Elections to Coleraine Borough Council were held on 7 June 2001 on the same day as the other Northern Irish local government elections. The election used four district electoral areas to elect a total of 22 councillors.

Election results

Note: "Votes" are the first preference votes.

Districts summary

|- class="unsortable" align="centre"
!rowspan=2 align="left"|Ward
! % 
!Cllrs
! % 
!Cllrs
! %
!Cllrs
! %
!Cllrs
! % 
!Cllrs
!rowspan=2|TotalCllrs
|- class="unsortable" align="center"
!colspan=2 bgcolor="" | UUP
!colspan=2 bgcolor="" | DUP
!colspan=2 bgcolor="" | SDLP
!colspan=2 bgcolor="" | Alliance
!colspan=2 bgcolor="white"| Others
|-
|align="left"|Bann
|bgcolor="40BFF5"|34.0
|bgcolor="40BFF5"|3
|20.0
|1
|30.5
|2
|1.6
|0
|13.9
|0
|6
|-
|align="left"|Coleraine Central
|bgcolor="40BFF5"|44.7
|bgcolor="40BFF5"|3
|30.4
|2
|17.6
|1
|7.3
|0
|0.0
|0
|6
|-
|align="left"|Coleraine East
|44.2
|3
|bgcolor="#D46A4C"|26.7
|bgcolor="#D46A4C"|2
|7.8
|0
|5.7
|0
|15.6
|0
|5
|-
|align="left"|The Skerries
|bgcolor="40BFF5"|35.5
|bgcolor="40BFF5"|2
|19.3
|1
|18.4
|1
|12.7
|0
|14.1
|1
|5
|-
|- class="unsortable" class="sortbottom" style="background:#C9C9C9"
|align="left"| Total
|36.0
|10
|27.5
|7
|19.7
|4
|6.4
|0
|10.4
|1
|22
|-
|}

District results

Bann

1997: 3 x UUP, 2 x SDLP, 1 x DUP
2001: 3 x UUP, 2 x SDLP, 1 x DUP
1997-2001 Change: No change

Coleraine Central

1997: 3 x UUP, 1 x DUP, 1 x SDLP, 1 x Alliance
2001: 3 x UUP, 2 x DUP, 1 x SDLP
1997-2001 Change: DUP gain from Alliance

Coleraine East

1997: 2 x DUP, 2 x UUP, 1 x Alliance
2001: 3 x DUP, 2 x UUP
1997-2001 Change: DUP gain from Alliance

The Skerries

1997: 2 x UUP, 1 x DUP, 1 x Alliance, 1 x Independent
2001: 2 x UUP, 1 x DUP, 1 x SDLP, 1 x Independent
1997-2001 Change: SDLP gain from Alliance

References

Coleraine Borough Council elections
Coleraine